Collidinic acid (pyridine-2,4,6-tricarboxylic acid) is an organic compound that belongs to the heterocycles (more precisely the heteroaromatics). It belongs to the group of pyridinetricarboxylic acids and consists of a pyridine ring which carries three carboxy groups in the 2-, 4- and 6-positions. The name is derived from 2,4,6-collidine (2,4,6-trimethylpyridine).

Preparation 
The compound can be obtained from the oxidation of 2,4,6-collidine by potassium permanganate.

Uses 
Collidinic acid can be used in the spectrophotometric determination of iron.

References 

Pyridines
Tricarboxylic acids
Aromatic acids